Amanli (also Romanized as Amānlī) is a village in Raz Rural District, Raz and Jargalan District, Bojnord County, North Khorasan Province, Iran. At the 2006 census, its population was 832, in 204 families.

References 

Populated places in Bojnord County